Tagiades gana, the immaculate snow flat, large snow flat or suffused snow flat, is a butterfly belonging to the family Hesperiidae found in Indomalayan realm.

Description

In 1891, Edward Yerbury Watson gave a detailed description:

Dioscorea alata is a host plant for the larvae.

Gallery

Cited references

References
Print

Watson, E. Y. (1891) Hesperiidae indicae: being a reprint of descriptions of the Hesperiidae of India, Burma, and Ceylon.. Vest and Co. Madras.

Online

Brower, Andrew V. Z. and Warren, Andrew, (2007). Coeliadinae Evans 1937. Version 21 February 2007 (temporary). http://tolweb.org/Coeliadinae/12150/2007.02.21 in The Tree of Life Web Project, http://tolweb.org/

Tagiades
Butterflies of Asia
Butterflies of Singapore
Butterflies of Indochina